Øm is a village with a population of 451 (1 January 2022)  in Lejre Municipality, located six kilometers southwest of Roskilde on the island of Zealand in Denmark.

Attractions 
The Øm Jættestue, or passage grave, is situated between Lejre and Øm, around 10 km. south west of Roskilde.

Sources 

Cities and towns in Region Zealand
Lejre Municipality